Dog Treat (Chinese: 狗請客) is a lost black and white Chinese animation made in 1924 by Huang Wennong.

Translations
The translation comes out to "Dog treating guests" or "Dog entertaining guests".  It does not translate to "Dog food".

History
It is a cartoon short produced under the "Chinese film company" (中華影片公司).  Since no other productions were ever made by this company, it is unknown as to whether it is actually a legitimate corporation.  The purpose of this clip is also up for debate, since it can either be in the form of an advertisement or animation experiment.

See also
History of Chinese Animation
Chinese Animation

References

External links
 China Movie DB

1920s animated short films
Chinese animated short films
1924 films
1924 animated films
Chinese silent short films